Héctor Eduardo Pérez Cuevas (born 16 June 1991) is a Venezuelan footballer who plays as a goalkeeper for Aragua F.C. in the Venezuelan Primera División.

References

External links
Héctor Pérez at playmakerstats.com (English version of ceroacero.es)

1991 births
Living people
Asociación Civil Deportivo Lara players
Trujillanos FC players
Atlético Socopó players
Aragua FC players
Venezuelan Primera División players
Venezuelan footballers
Association football goalkeepers
People from Acarigua
21st-century Venezuelan people